Stayful was a website and mobile application that allows consumers to bid for or book rooms at independent and boutique hotels. The rooms, which may have otherwise gone unsold, are sold at a lower price than the published rate for the consumer and a lower cost of distribution for the hotel.

Stayful is headquartered in New York with a location in San Francisco.

Concept
Stayful looks at hotel rates in comparison to what it determines as fair values based on market factors. These factors include supply and demand, day of the week time of the year and prices offered by competitors. A Stayful user sees a suggested fair bid on the website and may enter that bid (or even a lower bid) to be submitted to the hotel. Co-founder Cheryl Rosner said in The Wall Street Journal that hotels accept around 60% of the bids submitted from Stayful.

History

Founders 

Stayful was co-founded by Cheryl Rosner and Shariq Minhas. Rosner was the president of Hotels.com from 2003–2005 and was president of corporate travel at Expedia from 2005–2006.  Soon thereafter, Rosner became the President and CEO of TicketsNow, the world's largest independent online marketplace for premium event tickets, and orchestrated its sale to Ticketmaster in 2008.

Minhas has run engineering teams at Hotwire, Expedia, Jigsaw, FanIQ.

Launch and expansion 
Stayful launched in January 2013. 

As of 2015, Stayful had launched in 25 cities throughout the United States and Canada. Plans for international expansion included Europe.

Sale 

The company was sold to WorldVentures in 2017 and operations wound down.

References 

 
 

American travel websites